Kim Gyu-hyeong (born 29 March 1999) is a South Korean footballer currently playing as a midfielder for Jeju United, on loan from Dinamo Zagreb.

Career statistics

Club
.

Notes

References

1999 births
Living people
South Korean footballers
South Korean expatriate footballers
South Korea youth international footballers
Association football midfielders
Ulsan Hyundai FC players
GNK Dinamo Zagreb players
GNK Dinamo Zagreb II players
NK Istra 1961 players
NK Slaven Belupo players
First Football League (Croatia) players
Croatian Football League players
South Korean expatriate sportspeople in Croatia
Expatriate footballers in Croatia
People from Gyeongju
Sportspeople from North Gyeongsang Province